Zonk may refer to:

Zonk, nickname for Keith Moreland, former Major League Baseball player
Zonk, name of the undesirable prize on game show Let's Make a Deal
Zonk, Iran, village in Iran